Donald Emery Florence (born March 16, 1967) is an American former professional baseball pitcher, who pitched only one season in Major League Baseball  for the New York Mets in 1995.

Playing career
Florence grew up in Manchester, New Hampshire and played baseball and football at Manchester Memorial High School. He credited his time as a high school quarterback with helping develop his arm strength.

Florence began his college baseball career at Crowder College in Neosho, Missouri where he managed a 2.82 earned run average as a pitcher and a batting average of .344 as a sophomore. He committed to continue his college baseball career at Tennessee in 1987.

Florence was originally signed by the Boston Red Sox as an amateur free agent in October 1987, and compiled a 28-40 record, with a 3.64 earned run average and 379 strikeouts over seven seasons in their farm system.

He signed with the Mets as a minor league free agent following the  season, and after 47 innings pitched for the Norfolk Tides, in which he only allowed five earned runs, Florence received his first call up to the majors at the robust age of 28.

In his second game, he earned his first major league win against the Philadelphia Phillies on his way to a perfect 3-0 record. He made fourteen appearances out of the Mets' bullpen, and compiled an impressive 1.50 ERA, but never pitched another major league game after .

Personal life
Florence married the former Tonia Kennedy, from New Boston, New Hampshire, with whom he had a son, Tatum, in 1993.

References

External links
, or The Ultimate Mets Database

New York Mets players
Winter Haven Red Sox players
Major League Baseball pitchers
1967 births
Living people
Baseball players from New Hampshire
New Britain Red Sox players
Norfolk Tides players
Pawtucket Red Sox players
Rochester Red Wings players
Crowder Roughriders baseball players